The Triennial 2019, entitled Broken Nature: Design Takes on Human Survival, was the  22nd Triennial held in Milan from 1 March 2019 to 1 September 2019 at the .
It was sanctioned by the Bureau of International Expositions (BIE) on 12 June 2018.

The exhibition that gives the event its name and theme was curated by Paola Antonelli with Ala Tannir, Laura Maeran, and Erica Petrillo. The international participations were solicited via official governmental channels.

The thematic exhibition Broken Nature  consisted of three major commissions as well as numerous loans. An ambitious public program of events––with conferences, panels, workshops, screenings, and performances–– complemented the XXII Triennale.

There were 21 participating countries.

References 

2019 in Italy
Tourist attractions in Milan
World's fairs in Milan